Volejbalový Klub ČEZ Karlovarsko or simply VK ČEZ Karlovarsko, is a professional men's volleyball club located in Karlovy Vary that competes in Extraliga, the top flight of Czech volleyball, and the CEV Champions League at the international level.

The club was founded in 2014 and made its debut in the Czech Extraliga the same year. Despite the club's short history they have won 3 national titles and 2 SuperCups in less than 10 years.

Honours
 Czech Championship
Winners (3): 2017–18, 2020–21, 2021–22

 Czech SuperCup
Winners (2): 2021–22, 2022–23

Team
As of 2022–23 season

References

External links
 Official website 
 Team profile at Volleybox.net

Czech volleyball clubs
Volleyball clubs established in 2014
2014 establishments in the Czech Republic